This is a list of Hungarian Counties by GDP and GDP per capita.

List of Counties by GDP 
Counties by GDP in 2022 according to data by the OECD.

List of Counties by GDP per capita 
Counties by GDP per capita in 2022 according to data by the OECD.

References 

Counties by GDP
 GDP
Gross state product
Counties by GDP
Hungary